Ernest Gavin Wainscott (born 19 March 1932) is a New Zealand former cricket umpire. He stood in three ODI games between 1973 and 1975.

See also
 List of One Day International cricket umpires

References

1932 births
Living people
New Zealand One Day International cricket umpires
Sportspeople from Lower Hutt